The discography of Angus & Julia Stone, an Australian folk and indie pop duo, consisting of brother and sister Angus and Julia Stone, consists of four studio albums, one soundtrack, six live albums, two EPs and twenty-three singles.

Albums

Studio albums

Soundtrack albums

Live albums

Compilation albums

Extended plays

Singles 

Notes

Videos

Music videos

See also
 Angus Stone
 Julia Stone

References

Discographies of Australian artists
Folk music discographies
Rhythm and blues discographies